The Return of Bulldog Drummond is a 1934 British thriller film directed by Walter Summers and starring Ralph Richardson, Ann Todd and Claud Allister. It was based on the 1922 novel The Black Gang by H.C. McNeile and the fourth film in the series of twenty five.

Plot summary

Cast
 Ralph Richardson as Bulldog Drummond
 Ann Todd as Phyllis Drummond
 Joyce Kennedy as Irma Peterson
 Francis L. Sullivan as Carl Peterson
 Claud Allister as Algy Longworth
 Harold Saxon-Snell as Zadowa  
 Spencer Trevor as Sir Bryan Johnstone
 Charles Mortimer as Inspector McIver
 Wallace Geoffrey as Charles Latter  
 Patrick Aherne as Jerry Seymour
 Raymond Raikes as Ted Jerningham

References

External links
 
 
 

Films based on Bulldog Drummond
1934 films
1930s thriller films
British thriller films
British mystery films
1930s English-language films
Films directed by Walter Summers
British black-and-white films
1930s British films
Films shot at Welwyn Studios